Christopher James Walas (born 1955) is an American special effects artist, make-up effects artist, film director, producer, and screenwriter. He is best known for his work on the film The Fly (1986), for which he won an Academy Award and was nominated for two British Academy Film Awards.

Biography
His main body of work is with special effects in a wide variety of films, from science fiction to action-adventure. His work on The Fly led to his directorial debut on The Fly II. He also won an Academy Award for Special Effects Make-up on The Fly and is well known for his creation of the Gremlins. Walas was also partially responsible for creating the famous sequence in Raiders of the Lost Ark when the Nazis melt from the intense heat created by the Ark of the Covenant. Walas created false heads for Ronald Lacey, Wolf Kahler, and Paul Freeman.

Filmographies

Special effects

Makeup effects

Visual effects

Director

Awards and nominations

References

External links 

American make-up artists
Special effects people
1955 births
Living people
Best Makeup Academy Award winners
Film directors from Illinois
Horror film directors
People from Chicago